The women's javelin throw event at the 2007 Summer Universiade was held on 12–14 August.

Medalists

Results

Qualification
Qualification: 59.00 m (Q) or at least 12 best (q) qualified for the final.

Final

References
Results
Final results

Javelin
2007 in women's athletics
2007